Murder in Times Square is a 1943 American mystery film directed by Lew Landers and starring Edmund Lowe, Marguerite Chapman and John Litel.

The film's sets were designed by the art director Lionel Banks.

Plot
A Broadway playwright investigates a series of deaths that appear to be related to his latest play.

Cast
 Edmund Lowe as Cory Williams  
 Marguerite Chapman as Melinda Matthews 
 John Litel as Dr. Blaine 
 William Wright as Det. Lt. Tabor 
 Bruce Bennett as Supai George  
 Esther Dale as Longacre Lil  
 Veda Ann Borg as Fiona Maclair  
 Gerald Mohr as O'Dell Gissing  
 Sidney Blackmer as George Nevins  
 Leslie Denison as Rob Slocumb  
 Douglas Leavitt as Henry Trigg  
 George McKay as Southcote 
 Ernie Adams as Horsetooth  
 Richard Bartell as Reporter  
 Wilson Benge as Butler  
 Symona Boniface as Theatre Patron  
 Eddie Borden as Reporter 
 Lynton Brent as Audience Member  
 Jack Cheatham as Policeman  
 Edmund Cobb as Detective  
 Lew Davis as Reporter 
 Connie Evans as Showgirl  
 Bud Geary as Policeman  
 Sidney Grayler as Reporter  
 Al Hill as Older Detective  
 Robert Homans as Meehan, 1st Policeman 
 Lloyd Ingraham as Pedestrian  
 Eddie Laughton as Younger Detective  
 George Lloyd as Policeman  
 LeRoy Mason as Party Guest  
 David McKim as Newsboy  
 Lynn Merrick as Nurse  
 James C. Morton as Policeman  
 Frank O'Connor as Detective Lewis 
 Dagmar Oakland as Theatre Patron  
 Gerald Pierce as Newsboy  
 Ann Savage as Miss Ruth 
 Charles Sullivan as Policeman  
 Frank Sully as Benny the Baboon, Snake Exhibit Owner
 Paul Sutton as Drunk  
 John Tyrrell as Elevator Operator
 Marin Sais as Minor Role

References

Bibliography
 Morton, Lisa & Adamson, Kent. Savage Detours: The Life and Work of Ann Savage. McFarland, 2009.

External links
 

1943 films
1943 mystery films
American mystery films
Columbia Pictures films
Films directed by Lew Landers
American black-and-white films
1940s English-language films
1940s American films